is a playable character appearing in the 2016 video game Overwatch, a  first-person shooter video game  developed by Blizzard Entertainment. Outside of Overwatch, Hanzo also appears in related media, which includes animated shorts and webcomics, as well as a playable character in the crossover multiplayer online game Heroes of the Storm. He appeared again in Overwatch 2, a 2022 sequel to the original game.

The character is Japanese and the eldest brother of fellow playable character, Genji. The two brothers belonged to the Shimada clan, a fictional Japanese crime family. In his backstory, Hanzo was forced by the clan's elders to kill Genji. The dutiful but heartbroken Hanzo subsequently denounced his family and fled Japan to travel the world, seeking redemption from the actions of his past. In-game, he is classified as a damage character with a high difficulty ranking. He is an archer whose abilities include firing rapid bursts of arrows to engage high priority targets and jumping forward, as well as revealing the location of enemy players. 

Hanzo has been well received by critics and fans alike, with praise being directed towards his character arc involving his brother, design, and abilities. However, reviewers have also noted the character requires practice in order to be used effectively in the game.

Development and design

Originally, Hanzo and his brother Genji were created as a single cyborg-ninja  character named Hanzo, who wielded both a bow and sword. Due to feeling that the character was too unfocused in design and had too many ninja elements attached to him, it was decided that the character would be split into two brothers, with Hanzo obtaining the bow, name and clothing of the original character. He was one of 12 Overwatch characters revealed at BlizzCon 2014. He was described as being lightly armored, scampering up walls using his bare hands and being able to spot enemies through obstacles.

Hanzo was named after Hattori Hanzō, one of the most famous samurai and ninja in Japanese history. Hattori was also known as "Demon Hanzo" because of his tactician abilities, which is what inspired Hanzo's "Demon" skin during the "Overwatch Halloween Terror" seasonal event in October. Hanzo and Genji's story arc was inspired by the documentary Jiro Dreams of Sushi. Michael Chu, lead writer of Overwatch, described Hanzo's storyline as "will-he, won't-he fall to darkness", and stated that Hanzo is "real interesting because he can be a hero and a villain depending on your point of view – I think he can be both at the same time. There are more things to investigate there." In the English version of the game, Hanzo is voiced by Paul Nakauchi.

When Overwatch was first released, Hanzo had two normal abilities, the "Sonic Arrow" that would briefly highlight any enemies in range of where it landed for all his allies, and the "Scatter Arrow" that would split into five separate arrows that would ricochet off walls from the point of impact. The Scatter Arrow was found by Blizzard and players to often be too powerful, able to take out tank characters with normally high damage in a single shot. This also made Hanzo effectively play as a second sniper character alongside Widowmaker, and made him a difficult character to integrate into cooperative play. As early as November 2017, Jeff Kaplan and the Overwatch team discussed looking at vamping Hanzo's kit to deal with this problem. After a period of testing on the Public Test Region from April 20, 2018, the new kit was introduced on May 3, 2018. This kit replaced the "Scatter Arrow" with "Storm Arrows", the ability to fire six full-powered shots in rapid succession, along with a mid-air dash move. Along with other buffs and debuffs to other attack skills, these changes were designed to bring Hanzo to be more a front-line character.

Gameplay
Hanzo is classified as a damage character in Overwatch. He is a sniper and wields the "Storm Bow". His bow has an infinite number of arrows that can be fired in succession of one another. Alternatively, the arrows can be charged up for one second for a higher damage output and higher arrow velocity. Hanzo has two attacks relating to his bow. The first is "Sonic Arrow", which allows him and his teammates to see the location of their enemies that pass within a sphere of influence from the point of impact, and the second being "Storm Arrow", in which Hanzo can fire five arrows at full power in rapid succession. Hanzo also has the ability to "Lunge", dashing forward if he is in mid-air. Hanzo's ultimate ability is "Dragonstrike"; when using this ability, Hanzo fires a single arrow that releases two dragons that travel in a straight line, passing through all walls, until the end of the map. Any enemy caught in the line of fire and touching the dragons takes continuous direct damage, which can kill most unprotected characters within seconds. Hanzo also has a passive ability called "Wall Climb" that allows him to scale walls.

Appearances

Overwatch
According to the character's fictional biography, Hanzo Shimada is 38, and was formerly based in the fictional Japanese town Hanamura. Hanzo belongs to the Shimada family, a clan of assassins. As the eldest son in the family, Hanzo was bound by duty to inherit the Shimada empire from his father, Sojiro Shimada. From an early age, he was trained for that responsibility and showed skill in martial arts, bowmanship and swordplay. Upon his father's death, the clan elders instructed Hanzo to straighten out his younger brother Genji who was following a carefree, playboy lifestyle. When Genji refused, the clan elders forced Hanzo to kill him. Though, unbeknown to him, Genji was saved by Overwatch doctor Angela Ziegler. The act of killing his brother broke Hanzo's heart and drove him to abandon the clan. The lore states that Hanzo currently travels the world, "attempting to restore his honor and put the ghosts of his past to rest."

Heroes of the Storm
Hanzo was added to the Blizzard's crossover multiplayer online battle arena game Heroes of the Storm in December 2017, as part of the "Dragons of the Nexus" event. Hanzo's kit in the game is similar to his Overwatch abilities, including the charged, scatter, and sonic shot, wall-climb, and Dragonstrike.

Other appearances

Animations
In May 2016, Hanzo made his first appearance in Dragons, the third in a series of animated shorts. In the short, Hanzo returns to the Shimada castle in Hanamura to honor his brother Genji on the anniversary of their fight and the resulting latter's apparent death. Despite numerous guards being present, he is able to easily overpower them before they can alert anyone else. While making offerings at his brother's shrine, a man appears from out of the shadows, whom Hanzo presumes was sent to kill him. The two fight evenly matched until Hanzo, out of arrows, attempts to use Dragonstrike to defeat his opponent. To his surprise, the assassin is also able to use the Shimada dragons and turns them against him. Defeated, Hanzo coldly accepts his death. The assassin spares Hanzo and reveals himself to be Genji, alive after all these years. The cybernetic ninja tells Hanzo that he has forgiven him for having attempted to kill him. When Genji attempts to leave, Hanzo draws out his bow, labelling him a fool and stating that "real life is not like the stories [their] father told [them]". Despite this, Genji said that he still believed in his brother and had hope for him before leaving. With Genji gone, Hanzo returned to finish his offering.

Literature
Hanzo made his first appearance in the digital comic "Tracer: Reflection", which was released in December 2016. In the comic, which is set during Christmas, Hanzo is depicted with a different style than his appearance in the game. This includes him wearing an earring and a nose piercing, in addition to having his hair in an undercut style. In the comic, he's shown staring at a strawberry cake inside a shop with a little boy behind him.

Reception
Shortly after the game came out, Hanzo was described as a "fan favorite" by Matt Kim of Inverse and "one of the more colorful characters" of the cast in the game by Motherboards Emmanuel Maiberg. In Twinfinite's competition for "Gaming's Best 2017 Archer", Hanzo won in two out of four categories; "Arrow Variety" and "Fashion Style". Justing Chang stated that "he may take a lot of time to learn, but once you do, it pays off, and you’ll be one of the best snipers in your team while you play Overwatch."

The character has received a positive critical reception. VG247 referred to him as "the closest to a stealth ninja character" in Overwatch, noting that his abilities make him useful for finding and scattering opponents. Matt Whittaker of Hardcore Gamer wrote that Hanzo is "a sniper whose arrows do massive damage upon contact [and] is the type of hero that needs a bit of practice time before one feels totally comfortable", believing that player who practice with him will be able easily defeat their opponents. His Dragonstrike ability has also been well received for being able to kill the opposing team in seconds under the right circumstances.

Within the gaming community, players that frequently select Hanzo as their character are often derogatorily called "Hanzo mains", as other players typically feel the "Hanzo mains" are not sufficiently skilled with the character to contribute to the team's effort. Such "Hanzo mains" are frequently ridiculed or told to switch to other characters. Some have even have been reported for abusive behavior through Blizzard's system for selecting Hanzo. Kotaku spoke to several players who frequently play Hanzo; these players felt that Hanzo was one of the more well-balanced characters once one becomes skilled at playing him. Additionally, they stated that the hate towards Hanzo is more likely from other players feeling a Hanzo player makes for a good scapegoat when the team is otherwise not cohesive.

The term "Hanzo main" has been used outside of the Overwatch context as well. During the 2016 US presidential election, Nuisance Committee–made by the creators of Cards Against Humanity–created a billboard depicting Donald Trump playing Overwatch that read "Donald Trump mains Hanzo and complains about team comp in chat". The term became further popularized by a viral tweet in March 2017, when a schoolgirl was reprimanded by her school for calling a classmate a "Hanzo main" for stealing her pencil.

Mateus Mognon created the Hanzo National Church in Brazil in 2017 to honor the character. Mognon stated that he created the church as a form of protest art in order to show how ludicrous the Brazilian legislative system is. Additionally, the reason he chose Hanzo instead of Lúcio or Mercy—characters associated with healing in-game—is due to the character's resemblance to Jesus.

In May 2017, the social networking website Tumblr sifted through its data in order to determine which character pairings in Overwatch were the most popular. The data revealed that Hanzo and McCree (McHanzo) were the most popular pairing and that in all "shipping" related posts, they were shipped 35% of the time. A McHanzo related fan fic story titled "Hang the Fool", published on Archive of Our Own, was noted by Kotaku for being long-running. First starting in June 2016, the fanfic had garnered more than 300,000 hits by the end of 2017, even getting a fanzine based on it published. "Hang the Fool" was recognized by Syfys Kristina Manete in 2020, and Manete noted another McHanzo fic titled "The Chain" for being a "wonderful study of McCree and Hanzo's personalities and pasts culminates in a spectacular fic for fans of the pair". While McHanzo is not canonized within Overwatch and Blizzard has not confirmed it, people involved with the game and company have acknowledged it. McCree's voice actor Matthew Mercer has described the pairing as "adorable", noting that the characters' contrasting personalities makes the ship interesting. Director and lead designer of Overwatch, Jeff Kaplan, when asked by a fan at BlizzCon 2017, stated that McHanzo is one of his two favorite ships from the game; the other being Pharah and Mercy.

Further reading

Notes

References

External links
 Hanzo on IMDb

Fictional kyūjutsuka
Fictional characters from Mikawa Province
Fictional Japanese people in video games
Fictional marksmen and snipers
Fictional ninja
Male characters in animated films
Male characters in comics
Male characters in video games
Ninja characters in video games
Overwatch characters
Video game characters introduced in 2016